Ricci Mareno (born Joseph Ronald Ricci; June 29, 1938 - February 17, 2008) was an American country music songwriter and producer. He produced dozens of albums including 4 number one records. In 1974, SESAC honored Mareno with 17 individual awards, as well as an award for Country Music Writer of the Year and the "International Award".

Early in his Nashville career he wrote with Dolly Parton and Kris Kristofferson.  His compositions were recorded by Eddy Arnold, Waylon Jennings, Connie Smith, Tommy Overstreet, Charlie Rich, and others.

References

Country music composers
1938 births
2008 deaths